Elsie Louise Shaw was a naturalist and botanical artist many of whose watercolors are now in the collection of the Gray Herbarium at Harvard University.

Biography

As an illustrator, Shaw provided 48 full-page color plates for Frances Theodora Parsons' book How to Know the Wild Flowers (1893), which was the first field guide to North American wildflowers. It was something of a sensation: the first printing sold out in five days, and it was praised by Theodore Roosevelt and Rudyard Kipling, among others. The work as remained in print into the 21st century, although most later editions did not include Shaw's color plates (although they did include the black-and-white illustrations by Marion Satterlee).

Shaw also illustrated another of Parsons' books about wildflowers, According to Season (1902) with 32 full-page color plates.

Shaw collected specimens of eastern North American wildflowers for the Gray Herbarium as well as for the University of Maine and the New England Botanical Club. She painted  watercolors from these specimens—sometimes in the field—as well as from specimens collected by botanists like J. Franklin Collins, Merritt Lyndon Fernald, C.D. Lippincott, and Arthur H. Norton. Her "wonderfully accurate" paintings often show a small grouping of flowers on the stem with their leaves.

Her paintings were mounted and bound into eight folios by her family and donated to the Gray Herbarium. The collection covers the years 1887–1934. The folios are organized into flower family groupings as follows:
Folio 1: Adder's tongue to iris
Folio 2: Orchids
Folio 3: Sweet gale to crowfoot
Folio 4: Barberry to pulse
Folio 5: Wood sorrel to dogwood
Folio 6: Heath to borage
Folio 7: Mint to lobelia
Folio 8: Composites

References

Botanical illustrators
Year of birth missing
Place of birth missing
20th-century American artists
20th-century American women artists
Harvard University people